The Guatapurí River, or Rio Guatapurí in Spanish, is a river that flows from the eastern side of the Sierra Nevada de Santa Marta into the Cesar River in northern Colombia by the city of Valledupar. In the indigenous Chimila language, Guatapurí means "cold water".

Among its major affluents  are waters from the Curiba Lake, Donachui river, Capitanejo river, and Los Mangos river.

References

External links
 Alcaldia de Valledupar - Rios de la region

Rivers of Colombia
Valledupar
Geography of Cesar Department